Titanium powder metallurgy (P/M) offers the possibility of creating net shape or near net shape parts without the material loss and cost associated with having to machine intricate components from wrought billet. Powders can be produced by the blended elemental technique or by pre-alloying and then consolidated by metal injection moulding, hot isostatic pressing, direct powder rolling or laser engineered net shaping.

Blended elemental technique (BE) 
The traditional technique of titanium production is via the Kroll process which involves chlorination of TiO2 ore in the presence of carbon and reacting the resulting TiCl4 with magnesium to produce titanium sponge. These processes take place at temperatures as high as 1040 °C. The sponge particle range in size from 45 to 180 μm, with particles ~150 μm termed 'sponge fines'. These fines are irregularly shaped and porous with a sponge-like morphology. The fines are then blended with alloy additions; cold compacted into a green compact at up to 415 MPa then vacuum sintered at 1260 °C to produce a 99.5% dense component. Hot isostatic pressing (HIP) can further increase the density of these parts and produce components more economically than cast or wrought parts, but the porosity present in the material degrades fatigue and fracture properties. The BE approach has been used to produce valves for the Toyota Altezza, golf club heads and softball bats. More recently, close to 100% dense Ti Grade 5 parts has been achieved using a hydrided powder along with 60:40 Al:V master alloy. The mechanical properties compare well with those exhibited by cast-and-wrought products. A cost estimate of less than $3.00 for a 0.320 g automotive connection link has been made.

Pre-alloyed powder production 

Several techniques exist to produce pre-alloyed powder, such as Grade 5. In the hydride-dehydride process feedstock such as solid scrap, billet or machined turnings are processed to remove contaminants, hydrogenated to produce brittle material then ground under argon in a vibratory ball mill, typically at 400 °C for 4 hours at a pressure of 1 psi for Ti Grade 5. The resulting particles are angular and measure between 50 and 300 μm. Cold compaction after dehydrogenation of the powder, followed by either vacuum hot pressing (in this case the dehydrogenation process can be bypassed as hydrogen is removed under vacuum) or HIP and a final vacuum anneal, produces powders with hydrogen below 125 ppm. The possible presence of contaminants makes these powders unsuitable for use in critical aircraft applications.

In the plasma rotating electrode process (PREP), the feedstock, such as Ti Grade 5, is in the form of a rotating bar which is arced with gas plasma. The molten metal is centrifugally flung off the bar, cools down and is collected. The powders produced are spherical; between 100 and 300 μm is size, with good packing and flow characteristics, making the powder ideal for high quality, near net shapes produced by HIP, such as aviation parts and porous coatings on hip prostheses.

In the titanium gas atomisation (TGA) process, titanium is vacuum induction skull melted in a water cooled copper crucible, the metal tapped and the molten metal stream atomized with a stream of high pressure inert gas. The tiny droplets are spherical and measure between 50 and 350 μm. The TGA process has been used to produce a wide variety of materials such as commercially pure (CP) titanium, conventional alpha-beta and beta alloys.

In plasma atomization (PA) process, a titanium wire is atomized by 3 inert gas plasma jets to form spherical metal powders. The distribution of diameter obtained in the PA process ranges between 0–200 μm and the powders obtained is very pure. The PA process specializes in the production of high temperature melting material as titanium (CP-Ti, Ti-6Al-4V), niobium, molybdenum, tantalum and many more.

Powder consolidation 

Several metal consolidation techniques are used to produce the final product. Metal injection moulding (MIM) otherwise known as powder injection moulding is a well-established and cost-effective method of fabricating small-to-moderate size metal components in large quantities. It is derived from the method plastic injection moulding, whereby mixing of a metal powder with a polymer binder forms the feedstock, which is then injected into a mould, after which the binder is removed via heat treatment under vacuum before final sintering. With titanium however, the binders used in MIM results in the introduction of carbon into the matrix due to insufficient binder removal prior to sintering and/or deleterious reactions between the decomposing binder, the debinding atmosphere, and the metal phase. This results in titanium parts with mechanical properties unsuited for critical aerospace applications, but suitable for parts where tensile and impact properties are less important. Recently, work has been carried out to reduce the binder to < 8% volume fraction, resulting in the complete removal of the binder from the moulded component during heat treatment.

In the direct powder rolling (DPR) process BE powder is used to produce sheet and plate and composite multilayered sheet and plates. Sheets between 1.27 and 2.54 mm and 50 to 99+% dense of single layer CP titanium, Ti Grade 5, TiAl (Ti-48Al-2Cr-2Nb) and composite Ti/Grade 5/Ti and Grade 5/TiAl/Grade 5 have been produced by DPR and sintering.

Laser engineered net shaping (LENS) is an additive manufacturing technique for rapidly fabricating, enhancing and repairing metal components directly from CAD data. The processes use a high power solid state laser focused onto a metal substrate to create a ~1 mm diameter melt pool. Metal powder is then injected into the melt pool to increase the material volume and build up the component layer by layer. Experimental gas thrusters (build time 8 hours) and automotive brackets have been manufactured in Ti-Grade 5. Selective Laser Sintering (SLS) is similar, except that the laser selectively fuses powdered material by scanning on the surface of a powder bed. After each cross-section is scanned, the powder bed is lowered by one layer thickness, a new layer of material is applied on top, and the process is repeated until the part is completed.

In hot isostatic pressing high temperature and pressure are used to consolidate powders to close to their maximum theoretical densities.

Electric current assisted sintering, also known as spark plasma sintering (SPS) relies on fast application of resistive heating and pressure to consolidate powders close to their maximum theoretical densities, without the undesired grain growth effect, thereby retaining close to original grain size and achieving improved mechanical properties in the final product.

Emerging technologies 
Work is progressing on bypassing the conventional route of atomising wrought feedstock or sponge and the inherent cost associated with the traditional Kroll process. Several of these processes, such as the FFC, MER Corporation, OS, Ginatta and BHP Billiton processes rely on the electrolytic reduction of TiO2 (a cheap and abundant material) to form Ti metal. So far, no material from these processes has been sold commercially on the open market, and cost models have yet to be published, but they offer the possibility of inexpensive titanium powder in the near future. The countries that have such facilities to generate Titanium Sponge are Saudi Arabia, China, Japan, Russia, Kazakhstan, the USA, Ukraine and India. The Titanium Sponge Plant in India is the only one in the world that can undertake all the different activities of manufacturing aerospace grade titanium sponge under one roof.

References

Titanium
Metallurgical processes
Powders